Look Now is the 30th studio album by singer-songwriter Elvis Costello and his band The Imposters.

The album, released on 12 October 2018, was the first studio album released by Costello since 2013. Costello co-produced the album with Sebastian Krys.  Costello wrote the majority of the album's songs. However, three were co-written with Burt Bacharach. Additionally, Costello's collaboration with Carole King, 'Burnt Sugar Is So Bitter', had existed only as a demo for about 20 years before being produced for release on Look Now.  Costello told NPR that Look Now is the "uptown pop record with a little swagger" that he had been wanting to make for 20 years.

AllMusic asserts that the album “feels like a cross between Imperial Bedroom and Painted from Memory, Costello's 1998 collaboration with Burt Bacharach.", adding that the album "isn't rock & roll so much as it is pop that blends the craft of classic Brill Building tunes of the '60s with the narrative maturity of classic Broadway musicals and the sort of ballads that were once the purview of classic jazz vocalists".  A reviewer for The Associated Press described the album as a series of lamentations by various characters.

Look Now won the Grammy Award for Best Traditional Pop Vocal Album at the 62nd Grammy Awards.

Critical reception 

Look Now was extensively reviewed upon its release, and received aggregate ratings of 7.5/10 and 83/100 from AnyDecentMusic? and Metacritic respectively. 
NPR Music described the album as "Meticulously crafted, clever, polished...you can't imagine a group of surer hands for him to be working with", and called it one of the "best new albums" out at the time it was released.

Chris Willman who wrote for Variety called Elvis Costello and The Imposters "the world's greatest pit band". Willman further elaborates upon his description, stating that he intended it to act as "a raging endorsement of Costello's rage-free side", adding "It's so funny to be seeing him (Costello), after all this time, making a great cake of an album that doesn't really sound that much like any of the 30 before it".

USA Today writes, "The sophisticated chamber-pop arrangements suggest a return to the form he first explored in depth on Imperial Bedroom, a 1982 release produced by Beatles engineer Geoff Emerick. And it does so while holding its own against that masterpiece, perhaps because it was conceived after revisiting that album on the road".

Joe Lynch for Billboard reviewed the album as being filled with vitality, capturing powerful moments of both romantic and murky intent in this collection of lush, sophisticated pop.

Pitchfork stated: "Look Now plays at first like a simple set of songs that eschews grand concepts for immediacy... Despite their stateliness, these tunes are startlingly direct, both emotionally and melodically. They carry only the vaguest air of Costello’s signature cleverness and no trace of anger. [After 'Under Lime',] the rest of Look Now proceeds at a gentler, empathetic pace, lingering upon the bittersweet plights of their protagonists—usually women, always etched with kindness—instead of rushing toward a conclusion".

Uproxx described Costello as "one of the greatest songwriters of the last 40 years. Full-stop, no question, no debate necessary". It added that the track "Unwanted Number", through its blend of both melancholy sadness and deep irreverence, was indescribable other than as an Elvis Costello song.

Consequence of Sound writes, "Costello's been around so long that it should be easy to pinpoint what a new record will sound like even before fans put ears to it, but his ability to shape-shift in and out of genres wide and far still gives his new material a bit of intrigue. Look Now is another solid entry into an already healthy and vital body of work. It’s not his absolute best, but it still earns a spot in the meatier part of his iconic recording arc."

Kitty Empire for The Observer gave the album a score of 6/10 in her review, stating that "The album’s title speaks of urgency; its nearest song, Don’t Look Now, details the unwanted advances that bedevil a model. But the episode twinkles a little too prettily for the subject matter" as she ultimately concludes that the album is pretty but patchy. Similarly, The Evening Standard gave the album a score of 6/10  describing "The arrangements [as] gorgeous, some of the chorus hooks less so, and overall the laid-back Broadway-meets-Abbey Road vibe suit[ing] his adroit observations well".

Touring 
Elvis Costello and The Imposters toured America in support of the album in November and December 2018.

Track listing

"Regarde Maintenant" 
The deluxe edition of the album was released with a bonus EP called "Regarde Maintenant", also credited to Elvis Costello & the Imposters, containing four tracks. These tracks were also included on deluxe digital editions of the album, as well as the vinyl 2xLP.

Personnel 

Elvis Costello – vocals, arranger, composer, multi-instrumentalist
The Imposters
Steve Nieve – Fender Rhodes, keyboards, Mellotron, piano
Davey Faragher – bass, vocal arrangement, background vocals
Pete Thomas – drums, percussion, tambourine

With:
Sebastian Krys – co-producer, engineer, mixing, percussion, producer
Burt Bacharach – composer, piano
Carole King – composer
Bob Ludwig – mastering
Steve Bernstein – piccolo trumpet, trumpet
Cyrus Beroukhim – violin
Katarzyna Bryla – viola
Christopher Cardona – viola
Claire Chan – viola, violin
Robert Chausow – concertmaster, violin
Doug Emery – chart, pre-production
Lawrence Feldman – alto saxophone
Duarte Figueira – production assistance
Erik Friedlander – violoncello
Clark Gayton – trombone, bass trombone
Juliet Haffner – string contractor, viola
Sheryl Henze – flute, alto flute, piccolo
Christopher Komer – French horn
Kitten Kuroi – backing vocals
Briana Lee – backing vocals
Jeremy Levy – transcription
Tim Mech – guitar, technician
Scott Moore – second engineer
Louise Owen – violin
Seth Presant – second engineer
Michael Rabinowitz – bassoon
Chaz Sexton – second engineer
Coco Shinomiya – layout
Antoine Silverman – violin
Eamonn Singer – illustrations
Ivy Skoff – production coordination
Ron Taylor – engineer
Gosha Usov – second engineer
Doug Wieselman – alto saxophone, baritone saxophone, tenor saxophone

Charts

References

External links
 

2018 albums
Elvis Costello albums
Grammy Award for Best Traditional Pop Vocal Album